Verification of Employment (VOE) is a process used by banks and mortgage lenders in the United States to review the employment history of a borrower, to determine the borrower's job stability and cross-reference income history with that stated on the Uniform Residential Loan Application (Form 1003).  Lenders require complete VOE declaring all positions held for the last two years of employment history.

Most mortgages are preceded by both written and verbal VOEs.  Once a lender receives the initial loan application, a Written Verification of Employment (Form 1005) is sent to all current and previous employers within the last two years listed on the application.  This form is filled out by an authorized representative of the employer and includes dates of employment, positions held and a breakdown of compensation received.  This information is compared to both the loan application and the income documentation, such as W2's to ensure the information is correct. Employers are not required by law to complete the VOE forms. 

Once a mortgage has been approved and the borrowers have signed their mortgage documents, a Verbal Verification of Employment (Form 90) is conducted with all current employers prior to funding the loan.  This is done to ensure that the borrower has not stopped working since the application was submitted, which would influence the terms on which the loan was approved.

VOE guidelines are different for self-employed borrowers, as a VOE should not be completed by the loan applicant.  Self-employed borrowers are typically asked to provide either a current business license or, for borrowers who do not have a traditional business model, a letter from their Certified Public Accountant indicating that they have firsthand knowledge of their previous and continued employment as their tax preparer.

See also
The Work Number
Veri-Tax

Mortgage industry of the United States